Cesta is a small settlement west of Veliki Gaber in the Municipality of Trebnje in eastern Slovenia. The area is part of the traditional region of Lower Carniola. The municipality is now included in the Southeast Slovenia Statistical Region.

References

External links
Cesta at Geopedia

Populated places in the Municipality of Trebnje